Ariadaha is a locality in Kamarhati Municipality of North 24 Parganas district in the Indian state of West Bengal. It is close to Kolkata and also a part of the area covered by Kolkata Metropolitan Development Authority (KMDA).

History
Ariadaha-Dakshineswar situated close to North Kolkata carries a glorious past in the Bengal Renaissance that still remains largely unacknowledged in the mainstream historical accounts. Once it was under the jurisdiction of Calcutta (Kolkata) District. Within 24 Parganas, Kolkata was one of the Parganas and Ariadaha-Dakshineswar was under it.
Like other ancient parts of Rarh Banga (adivision of ancient South Bengal) this place was full of the ancient inhabitants of Bengal like the Hanri, Dome, Nishad, Kahar who 
originated from the Proto-Australoids according to Anthropology. Other casts like the Brahmans, Kayesthas and the Vaidyas etc. entered later. However, with the tide of time a 
mixed culture grows and inherited by the peoples of this region though there were two groups of people were in the frontline of the cultural scenario. One was liberal and other was certainly conservative. The conservatives constituted the most powerful sections of society with the liberals lagging behind as their opposition could hardly cause flutter in the orthodox socio-cultural matrix. The scenario did not show any
significant change even after the introduction of colonial British education and culture in this region as happened in the other parts of old Calcutta. During the last half of 15th century, from almost about 1690 A.D., Kolkata began to reorient itself towards colonial culture under the leadership and colonial tutelage of Job Charnak. But little did change in the region of Ariadaha-Dakshineswar—the old society beset with inhuman superstitious practices. Ariadaha-Dakshineswar as a part of old Calcutta as it witnessed a cultural interface between both conservative and liberal forces. From the medieval period, highly educated and economically enriched families began to enter this region (Ariadaha-Dakshineswar), effecting significant changes in the socio-economic patterns.

Ariadaha-Dakshineswar was primarily the motherland of highly educated middle class. One of the janapadas (a big unit of 20 or more villages in ancient India) of Calcutta could not become a big city and that was Dakshineswar (Sen: 2004). Famous Historian Martin mentioned Dakshineswar as the Capital of Bengal (Mullick: 1403, Bengali Year). The cultural sphere of Ariadaha-Dakshineswar was patronized and encouraged by the Maharajas the regional rulers of Krishnanagar of Nadia. The educated liberals were in the leading part of the protest movement by the Vaishnavas, Shaivas and Shaktas against the Brahmanism. Thus a new line of thought spread across this area. One of the opinions regarding the origin of the name of 
Calcutta was the word Kalikhetra and it denotes the place from Kalighat to Dakshineswar (Dey: 1989).

Location
Ariadaha-Dakshineswar is situated 22040'0 North latitude and 88022'0 East longitude and 11 kilometers away from Chowringhee, under the jurisdiction of Kamarhati Municipality (Malley: 2009) now. Today if we draw a borderline on four sides of it, we can see Kumarhatta (now Kamarhati), another ancient settlement is situated on its north, Nowdapara, Another undivided area of Ariadaha, on Northeast, Dakshineswar, Alambazar-Baranagar on its south,  Belgharia-Rathtala along with Dantia Canal (a branch of Upper Bagjola Canal) and BT Road on the east and the Hooghly River on the west.

Memorable places

Temples
 Ariadaha Muktakeshi Kalibari
 Adyapeath Temple
 Ariadaha Path Bari
 Bindhyabasini Temple

River Side
 Sukhada Debi (Battala) Ghat
 Char Mandir Ghat
 Sarat Ghosal Ghat 
 Satish Ch. Basu Mallik (Garan) Ghat
 Ariadaha Patbari Ghat
 Ariahada Ferry Ghat
 Ariadaha Burning Ghat
 Ariadaha Madhusudan Ray Ghat

Education

Schools
 Ariahada Kalachand High School
 Ariadaha Girls High School
 Techno India Public School
 Delhi Public International School, Rathtala
 Ariahada Sarbamangala Balika Vidyalaya
 Dakshineswar High School
 Dakshineswar Sri Sri Sarada Devi Balika Vidyamandir
 Ariadaha Sree Vidyaniketan High School
 Sri Satyananda Sikhyamandir (Nursery & Primary School)
 Ariadaha Ramanand Charity Vidyalaya
 Adamas International School
 DAKSHINESWAR BHARATI BHAWAN GIRLS HIGH SCHOOL

Colleges
 Adyapeath Annada BEd College
 Adyapeath Annada Polytechnic College (Govt. Spns.)
 Aspire Education
 Hiralal Majumdar Memorial College For Women

Hospitals
 Sri Ramakrishna Matri Mangal, Ariadaha
 Dr. BC Roy Seba Sadan, Ariadaha
 Baranagar Matri Sadan Hospital
 College of Medicine & Sagore Dutta Hospital
 Bindu Devi Charitable Hospital
 Zenith Super Specialist Hospital

Transportation
Few buses ply along D.D. Mondal Ghat Road-A.C. Sarkar Road-Kumud Ghosal Road-M.M. Feeder Road. The Ariadaha bus-stand is on A.C. Banerjee Road which is connected to Kumud Ghosal Road.

Bus

Private
 DN2 Dakshineswar - Barasat

Mini
 S181 Ariadaha - Babughat

WBTC
 S17A Ariadaha - Kudghat
 S57 Ariadaha - Nabanna

Train and metro rail
The nearest railway stations of Ariadaha are Dakshineswar railway station and Baranagar Road railway station.

The nearest metro Stations of Ariadaha are Dakshineswar metro station and Baranagar metro station. Both the stations are part of Kolkata Metro's North- South Line.

Services:
 Ariadaha - Uttarpara
 Ariadaha - Belur
 Ariadaha - Ratanbabu Ghat
 Ariahada - Bagbazar
 Ariahada - Howrah Station
 Ariadaha - Shipping

References

Neighbourhoods in Kolkata
Kolkata Metropolitan Area
Cities and towns in North 24 Parganas district
Neighbourhoods in North 24 Parganas district